Paul Bartlett Ré (pronounced "Ray") is an American artist, writer, poet and peace advocate. He is known for his book "The Dance of the Pencil: Serene Art" and for the Paul Bartlett Ré Peace Prize administered by the University of New Mexico Foundation.

His book Art, Peace and Transcendence: Réograms That Elevate and Unite received the 2016 New Mexico – Arizona Book Award for Philosophy and the 2019 Independent Press Award for Distinguished Favorite in Fine Arts.

In 2007, the University of New Mexico (UNM) established a bi-annual peace prize named after him honoring his commitment and work for promoting peace around the world.

Biography

Paul Bartlett Ré was born in Albuquerque, New Mexico, in 1950. Valedictorian of his high school, Ré went on to earn a B.Sc. in Physics from the California Institute of Technology in 1972, graduating with honors (fifth in his class).(Veronda, Winifred, 1989) Ré selected as his first medium the drawing pencil. Writing in the San Francisco Chronicle, art critic Alfred Frankenstein said, "Ré  is a virtuoso of the pencil which he uses with incredible delicacy and refinement." (Frankenstein, Alfred, 1974) Paul Ré has also exhibited acrylic paintings, found object constructions, sculpture, bas-reliefs, embossings, Réograms (hybrid hand-digital prints), and sumi-e paintings. In the encyclopedia, Contemporary Graphic Artists, art historian Denis Wepman wrote, "The singular purity of Ré's simple, highly stylized designs gives them a unique place in modern art . . . The extraordinary sensitivity of their line and composition appeals to the senses with a haunting directness." (Wepman, Dennis, 1988)

Ré started exhibiting in California and New Mexico during the 1970s. Since then, he has had 22 solo exhibits in 13 states, including at the UNM Jonson Gallery, Albuquerque Museum, Triangle Gallery, Wichita Museum, Sumter Gallery, J. B. Speed Museum, the Colorado Springs Museum and the Karpeles Museum.

In 1979, Ré began creating the embossed works which gave a tactile form to his visual creations and the resulting exhibition “TOUCHABLE ART: An Exhibit for the Blind and the Sighted” travelled in the United States and into Canada from 1981 to 1994. During its 18 showings, about 100,000 people experienced the works; a handmade, thermoformed companion volume with Braille and text was produced in 1983. (Reed, David, 1990) A documentary film on his Art was produced by SCETV in 1990.

In 1993, the volume "THE DANCE OF THE PENCIL: Serene Art by Paul Ré” collected and chronicled the development of Ré's work up to that date.

Music is another facet of Ré's creativity. His 50-minute recording Compositions for Classical guitar included an introduction to his traveling exhibit.  It was reviewed in the Summer 1986 issue of THE LOG OF THE BRIDGETENDER of the American Council of the Blind by Editor Sue Tullos. (Tullos, Sue, 1986)

Paul Bartlett Ré Peace Prize
Extending Paul Ré's work of promoting "harmony in the world", the bi-annual Paul Bartlett Ré Peace Prize has been established at the University of New Mexico. Managed by the UNM Foundation, the bi-annual prize award is given to a UNM student, faculty, staff person, retiree, volunteer or alumnus who has demonstrated notable achievements in promoting world peace and understanding. From 2007–2020, 32 individuals and organizations have been honored.

Writings and awards

Paul Ré's writings appear in Leonardo 13–2, 14–2 and 15–2, SPIRIT OF ENTERPRISE: The 1990 Rolex Awards, The Journal of Visual Impairment, New America, La Mamelle and Design Journal. Illustrated essays, 1000 to 3000 words in length, on Ré's work are included in Contemporary Graphics Artists 3rd edition, Great Minds of the 21st Century 2nd volume and 4th editions, and The Dictionary of International biography 36th edition. He is profiled in WHO'S WHO IN AMERICAN ART, WHO'S WHO IN AMERICA, and WHO'S WHO IN THE WORLD and other reference volumes worldwide.(Slocum, Dana, 2005-ongoing)

His three books are TOUCHABLE ART FOR THE BLIND AND SIGHTED (a handmade limited edition), THE DANCE OF THE PENCIL: Serene Art by Paul Ré, and ART, PEACE, AND TRANSCENDENCE: Réograms That Elevate and Unite which is published by UNM Press. It received the 2016 New Mexico – Arizona Book Award for Philosophy. It was also a finalist in Arts; Science; and Large Format Cover Design. The book received the 2019 Independent Press Award for Distinguished Favorite in Fine Arts.

Paul is editing his collected poems THE IRIS BALLET and compiling his 55 volumes of aphorisms and micro-essays. (Ingles, Paul, Suzanne, Kryder, 2017)

In 1982 and 1984 he received residency grants at the Wurlitzer Foundation in Taos, New Mexico.

See also
List of poets from the United States

Sources
Adams, Anna, "Greening the Peace Movement", Mirage Magazine, Fall 2015, pages 38–39. http://www.unmalumni.com/mirage-magazine.html (scroll to pages 38–39.)
Dancer, Faren, "The Artwork of Paul Ré and the Ré Peace Prize", Unicopia Green Radio, June 20, 2012. 
Frankenstein, Alfred. "Top-Notch Art." San Francisco Chronicle, February 25, 1974.
Ingles, Paul; Kryder, Suzanne, "Artist Paul Ré Points the Way to Peace,"  Peace Talks Radio, February 24, 2017  
Milling, Jimmy, "Touchable Works Are Pleasing to All",  The Item, May 2, 1990, page 7. https://news.google.com/newspapers?nid=1980&dat=19900502&id=VpUiAAAAIBAJ&sjid=takFAAAAIBAJ&pg=1383,142984&hl=en.
Pulkka, Wesley, "Artist Ré extends Jonson's transcendental vision", Albuquerque Journal, October 7, 2001, page F5. 
Ré, Paul, "My Drawings and Paintings and a System for Their Classification", Leonardo, vol XIII n. 2, spring 1980, Oxford, England: Pergamon Press, pages 94–100. https://www.jstor.org/stable/1577977?seq=1#page_scan_tab_contents
Ré, Paul, "On My Drawings and Paintings: An Extension of the System of Their Classification", Leonardo, vol XIV n. 2, spring 1981, Oxford, England: Pergamon Press, pages 106-14. https://www.jstor.org/stable/1574401?seq=1#page_scan_tab_contents
Ré, Paul, "On the Progression of My Figurative Drawings Toward Higher Abstraction and Outward Simplicity", Leonardo, vol XV n. 2, spring 1982, Oxford, England: Pergamon Press, pages 109-14. https://www.jstor.org/stable/1574544?seq=1#page_scan_tab_contents
Ré, Paul, "Balance and its Significance in my Drawings, Paintings, and Tactual Embossings for the Blind", Symmetry of Structure Symposium Abstracts, International Symmetry Association, August 13–19, 1989, Budapest, Hungary. http://symmetry-us.com/Journals/0-2/re.pdf 
Ré, Paul, "The Dance of the Pencil: Serene Art of Paul Ré", Paul Ré Archives, 1993 (limited edition of 1,000).
Ré, Paul,"Réograms and the Paul Bartlett Ré Peace Prize at University of New Mexico", Journal of the Print World, Fall 2009, page 21.
Ré, Paul, Art, Peace, and Transcendence: Réograms That Elevate and Unite, UNM Press, 2015. 
Reed, David W., ed."A Book and Two Traveling Exhibits for the Blind and Sighted", Spirit Of Enterprise: The 1990 Rolex Awards, Bern, Switzerland: Buri International, 1990, pages 378-80.
Ronstadt, Jason, "Art, Peace, and Transcendence: Réograms That Elevate and Unite," Journal of the Print World, April 2016, page 23. 
Salazar, Martin, "Duke City Native Starts Peace Prize", Albuquerque Journal, March 22, 2010, page A4:  (subscription required)
Schillaci, Kelle, "The Dance of the Pencil", Alibi, March 15, 1999: 
Slocum, Dana, ed. “Ré, Paul Bartlett.” In Who’s Who in America. 60th to 68th editions. Berkeley Heights, NJ: Marquis Who’s Who, 2006–2014 (and ongoing).
———, ed. “Ré, Paul Bartlett.” In Who’s Who in American Art. 26th to 34th editions. Berkeley Heights, NJ: Marquis Who’s Who, 2005–2014 (and ongoing).
———, ed. “Ré, Paul Bartlett.” In Who’s Who in the World. 24th to 31st editions. Berkeley Heights, NJ: Marquis Who’s Who, 2006–2014 (and ongoing).
Steinberg, David, "Art of Living: Physics, Nature, and Inner Harmony Infuse the Diverse Works of Paul Ré," Sunday Albuquerque Journal, Life in New Mexico, February 7, 2016, page 17.  http://www.abqjournal.com/719728/entertainment/physics-nature-and-inner-harmony-infuse-the-diverse-works-of-paul-re.html
Tullos, Sue. “Meet F-I-A Member, Paul Ré.” The Log of the Bridgetender 18 (Summer 1986). Published by the American Council of the Blind.
Veronda, Winnifred, "Paul Ré: Expressing the Art in Physics", Caltech News, Dec 1977.
Veronda, Winnifred, "Expressing the Art in Science", Caltech News, Vol 23-4, Aug 1989, pages 6–7.
Wepman, Dennis,"Ré, Paul B.",   Contemporary Graphic Artists, Vol 3, Detroit, MI: Gale Research, 1988, pages 181-3.
Wepman, Dennis, "Paul Ré, Dance of the Pencil", Journal of the Print World, Fall 1994, page 23.

References

External links

1950 births
21st-century American male writers
American artists
Living people